The albums discography of American country singer Reba McEntire contains 34 studio albums, 25 compilation albums, two live albums, three extended plays and has appeared on 27 albums. Of these albums, 27 have received a certification of at least Gold from the Recording Industry Association of America. Her highest-certified album is the 1993 compilation Greatest Hits Volume Two, which is certified quintuple-platinum for U.S. shipments of five million copies. According to RIAA, she has sold 41 million certified albums in the United States, making her the seventh best selling female album artist in the United States. 

Widely recognized as the "Queen of Country" by various media outlets, she has sold an estimated 90 million records worldwide throughout her career, making her the 2nd best selling female country artist in history. Country Music Hall of Fame hailed McEntire as "the most successful female country performer of her generation". She has scored 13 number one albums on Billboard's Top Country Albums, one of the most by any country artist ever. Rolling Stone listed her as the 36th Greatest Country Artist of all time. Billboard also listed her as the 44th Top Country Artist of the 2010s.

Studio albums

1970s–1980s

1990s

2000s

2010s

Compilation albums

1980s

1990s

2000s

2010s–2020s

Live albums

Extended plays

Other album appearances

Notes

References

External links
 Reba album discography at her official website

Country music discographies
Discographies of American artists